Frøy Aagre (born 8 June 1977 in Tønsberg, Norway) is a Norwegian jazz saxophonist.

Career 
Aagre is one of the leading saxophonists of Norway, playing tenor and soprano saxophone with an individual sound that builds on inspirations by such saxophonists as Dave Liebman and Wayne Shorter. She has studied saxophone and composition in Oslo, Birmingham, London, New York and Buenos Aires. Aagre was awarded the Norwegian Government scholarship for the year 2005/2006.

Aagre released her first album Katalyze in 2004 with Frøy Aagre Offbeat, including Andreas Ulvo, Freddy Augdal and Roger Williamsen, and attracted notice throughout Europe, and soon found herself invited to perform at major festivals in Europe, North America and India. There after followed Countryside (2006) and Cycle of Silence (2010) both receiving great reviews. When attending the Banff Jazz Workshop in Canada, in 2005, Aagre started a collaboration with the Brisbane band Misinterprotato (now known as Trichotomy). This led to touring with the trio, including an appearance at Wangaratta Jazz Festival in 2009.

Discography

Solo albums 
With Frøy Aagre Offbeat
2004: Katalyze (Aim Records)
2006: Countryside (Aim Records)

As Frøy Aagre
2010: Cycle Of Silence (ACT Records)

As Frøy Aagre Electric
2013: Frøy Aagre Electric (momentum rec.)

References

External links 

20th-century Norwegian saxophonists
21st-century Norwegian saxophonists
Norwegian jazz saxophonists
Norwegian jazz composers
Women jazz composers
Musicians from Tønsberg
1977 births
Living people
20th-century Norwegian women musicians
21st-century Norwegian women musicians
Trondheim Jazz Orchestra members
ACT Music artists